Roger Garrigue (born 26 June 1941), sometimes written as Roger Garrigues (born in Toulouse, on 26 May 1941), is a French former professional rugby league footballer and coach, who played as  or .

Biography 
Originally, a rugby union player formed at TOEC XV, Garrigue would later switch codes to play for Saint-Gaudens and then, for Toulouse Olympique, where he would play for most of his career, before joining Villefranche-de-Rouergue.

Defined as "An excellent defender and strategist", an author in 1984 estimated that he missed  "the great acceleration, which decides everything, to equal the more sophisticated players at his preferred position".

He also represented France, playing in the 1968 Rugby League World Cup final lost against Australia.

Garrigue also was the coach of France national rugby league team in 1978 and then, in 1981, coaching France in two tests lost against New Zealand in Carlaw Park.

An aeronautical technician, according to a source in 2011, he lives in "Ariège, near Suc".

Honours

 Rugby league :
 World Cup :
 1 time runner-up in 1968 (France).

Caps

International caps

References

1941 births
Living people
France national rugby league team captains
France national rugby league team coaches
France national rugby league team players
French rugby league coaches
French rugby league players
Rugby league centres
Rugby league five-eighths
Rugby league halfbacks
Saint-Gaudens Bears players
Sportspeople from Toulouse
Toulouse Olympique players
Villefranche XIII Aveyron players
Racing Club Albi XIII players